Epirixanthes is a genus of flowering plants belonging to the family Polygalaceae.

Its native range is Southern China to Tropical Asia.

Species
Species:

Epirixanthes compressa 
Epirixanthes confusa 
Epirixanthes cylindrica 
Epirixanthes elongata 
Epirixanthes kinabaluensis 
Epirixanthes pallida 
Epirixanthes papuana

References

Polygalaceae
Fabales genera